Myo Min Phyo (born 2 November 1999) is a Burmese footballer who plays as a left winger for Sagaing United.

References

External links
match interview
skills & goals video

1999 births
Living people
Burmese footballers
Association football wingers